Radu Albot and Alexander Cozbinov were the defending champions but chose not to defend their title.

Purav Raja and Divij Sharan won the title after defeating Arjun Kadhe and Fernando Romboli 6–4, 3–6, [10–8] in the final.

Seeds

Draw

References

External links
 Main draw

Istanbul Challenger - Doubles
2022 Doubles